Half of Freedom is a novel by Dr. Ghazi Abdul Rahman Al Gosaibi published in 1999 (5th edition). The novel was banned in Saudi Arabia for a while. It tells the story of a group of young men with different ideologies living together in an apartment in Cairo while they finish their studies. The novel discusses in detail the state of intellectual currents among Arab youth in the inflamed period of Arab history between 1948 and 1967. Half of Freedom spread greatly and its editions varied until finally it was permitted again in Saudi Arabia.

Critical reviews 
 "The opinions surrounding this novel varied. Some believed that the author was a narcissist in his novel by putting an aura of glorification for the first protagonist in the novel, "Fouad" who is believed to represent the author himself and this aura is based on the irony that exists in the political and cultural environment of the novel. Other critics believed that whether the novel somewhat held a hint of an autobiography or not, the author managed successfully to create creative characters full of life regardless of their differences, who also embody human contradictions. The novel also magnificently depicted a period of thoughtful, political, and social life that Cairo was going through at the time, and it embodied the contradictions and conflicts between the social environments. 
 Read this story clearly without the favoritism of critics with open eyes and a pure sense of criticism from your side to differentiate between what is true of the Arabian lifestyle and what is not because this book is packed with both. It is the gift of the Gulf and the Arabian Peninsula to the Arab culture in the great Arab world for the new year 1994 and the 2000s.

Mohammed Jaber Al-Ansari  – Al Ayam Newspaper – Bahrain. 

 This novel represents two insults, the first is for the intelligence of the reader and history. The second is for the novel and the author because he does not know anything about the novel but its name. He must not be stung by the novel, which requires his talent and abilities that we do not think he is capable of.

Samir El-Youssef  – Al-Quds Al-Arabi newspaper – London. 

 Al Gosaibi is brave for depicting the sexual passion and emotional confusion and the female body. He is also brave for discovering the spiritual Arab man.

Nadim Jarjurah – As-Safir newspaper – Beirut.

 Shaqqat Al-Hurrīyah is a novel written by a poet but its reader does not pose the ambiguity of poetry and its passion and its brief brevity. Ghazi Al Gosaibi is clearly skilled in having a softness in storytelling in a way that allows him to depict the characters and places and scenes without noticing the poet. 

Muḥammad ʻAlī Farḥāt – Al-Hayat newspaper – London.      

 Besides flirtation and politics, Ghazi Al Gosaibi transfers the reader of Shaqqat Al-Hurrīyah to that rich, cultural, and artistic environment where they live with the protagonist who's trying to write the story and belong to the scholars. His observations started from the salon, Naguib Mahfouz's session, and passed through Anis Mansour who used to teach people to prepare spirits and still is.

Asharq Al-Awsat – London.

 A well-formed plot, a thrilling storytelling technique, a smoothness in performance, a fresh mold, and a simplicity in expressing as if he's an old expert in the pure fiction industry.

Jihad Faḍil – Al Hawadess newspaper – London.

Television adaptation 
The novel was made into a TV show under the same name and was aired on MBC in 1995 directed by Magdy Abu Emeira and scripted by Mamdouh El Leithy.

References 

1999 novels
Saudi Arabian novels
Arabic-language novels
Censored books
Novels adapted into television shows